Isaac Bloch (1848–1925) served as Chief Rabbi in Nancy, France. He wrote 16 articles for the Jewish Encyclopedia.

Bloch was a native of Alsace.  He served as a chaplain during the siege of Paris.  For most of the 1880s he served as a rabbi in Algeria.  He was appointed chief rabbi of Nancy in 1890.

References 

1848 births
1925 deaths
French Orthodox rabbis
19th-century French rabbis
20th-century French rabbis
Contributors to the Jewish Encyclopedia